Chambersiellidae is a family of nematodes belonging to the order Rhabditida.

Genera:
 Chambersiella Cobb, 1920
 Cornilaimus Truskova & Eroshenko, 1977
 Diastolaimus Rahm, 1928
 Geraldius Sanwal, 1971

References

Nematodes